Atherton High School may refer to:

Atherton High School, Greater Manchester, a secondary school in Atherton, Greater Manchester, England
Atherton High School, Louisville, a high school in Louisville, Kentucky, United States
Atherton State High School, a high school in Atherton, Queensland Australia

See also
Atherton (disambiguation)